Margie Santimaria (born 18 February 1989), is an Italian professional triathlete, National U23 Champion of the year 2010 and number 4 in the National Elite Ranking 2010.

Biography

In Italy, Margie Santimaria represents Atlectica Bellinzago and Gruppi Sportivi Polizia di Stato Fiamme d'Oro.
In 2010, Santimaria also took part in the prestigious French Club Championship Series Lyonnaise des Eaux representing TriClub Nantais like her country fellow Charlotte Bonin. Santimaria took part in only one of the five triathlons of this circuit and placed 22nd at Beauvais (13 June 2010), thus being the second best of her French club, which could not nominate any French triathlete.

In 2008 Margie Santimaria concluded the secondary school ISIS A. Omodeo in Mortara, close to her native town Vigevano.

ITU Competitions 
In the four years from 2007 to 2010 Santimaria took part in 7 ITU races. From 2010 on she has competed in the Elite category only.
The following list is based upon the official ITU rankings and the athlete's Profile Page. Unless indicated otherwise, the following competitions are triathlons and belong to the Elite category.

DNS = did not start • DNF = did not finish

Notes

External links
 
 Santimaria's Club Atletica Bellinzago in Italian
 Italian Triathlon Federation in Italian

Italian female triathletes
Living people
1989 births
Triathletes of Fiamme Oro
21st-century Italian women